Alexander Lochian Wood  (June 12, 1907 – July 20, 1987) was a Scottish American soccer defender.  Wood began his club career in the United States before moving to England in the early 1930s.  He also played all three U.S. games at the 1930 FIFA World Cup.  He is a member of the National Soccer Hall of Fame.

Youth
Wood's parents moved the family to the United States in 1921 when Wood was fourteen years old.  His family settled in Gary, Indiana, where he attended Emerson High School and gained his U.S. citizenship a year later.  He also worked for the local Union Drawn Steel Company.

Club career
Wood began his club career with Chicago Bricklayers and Masons F.C.  In 1928, the Bricklayers went to the National Challenge Cup final before losing to New York Nationals.  He then moved to Detroit Holley Carburetor.  In 1930, Wood turned professional with the Brooklyn Wanderers of the American Soccer League.  The Wanderers folded in 1931, and there is a gap in Wood's career for two years. In 1933 Wood moved to England to play with Leicester City.  In 1936, he transferred to Nottingham Forest for one season before joined Colchester United in 1937.  In 1938, he moved to Chelmsford City of the Southern League before retiring in 1939 and returning to the United States.

National team

Scotland youth
In 1921, Wood played once for Scotland in a junior team match against Wales before moving to the United States.

U.S. senior
Wood would then earn four caps with the U.S. national team in 1930.  Three of the games came at the 1930 FIFA World Cup.  At that Cup, the U.S. won the first two games, over Belgium and Paraguay by a 3–0 score in each game, they lost to Argentina 6–1 in the semifinals.  Following the cup, the U.S. played Brazil on August 17, 1930, before returning to the U.S.  That was Wood's last game with the national team.

Post soccer career
After retiring from playing professional soccer, Wood moved back to Gary, Indiana, where he worked for the U.S. Steel Corporation.  He retired in 1970 and was inducted into the National Soccer Hall of Fame in 1986.

Honors

Club
Colchester United
 Southern Football League Winner (1): 1938–39

See also
List of United States men's international soccer players born outside the United States

References

External links
 
 1930 World Cup team photo
 

1907 births
1930 FIFA World Cup players
1987 deaths
British emigrants to the United States
American Soccer League (1921–1933) players
American expatriate soccer players
American soccer players
Brooklyn Wanderers players
Chelmsford City F.C. players
Colchester United F.C. players
Detroit Holley Carburetor players
Leicester City F.C. players
National Soccer Hall of Fame members
Nottingham Forest F.C. players
United States men's international soccer players
Soccer players from Indiana
People from Lochgelly
Association football defenders
Footballers from Fife